Abdulrahman bin Hamad bin Jassim bin Hamad Al Thani is the Qatari Minister of Culture. He was appointed as minister on 19 October 2021.

Education 
Al Thani holds a Bachelor in Mass Communication from Qatar University.

References 

Living people
21st-century Qatari politicians
Qatari politicians
Government ministers of Qatar
Year of birth missing (living people)

Qatar University alumni